Jessica Mimi Porfiri (born 13 October 1994), who performs as Kota Banks, is an Australian pop singer-songwriter and musician. She signed to Nina Las Vegas's label, NLV Records, in May 2017, which released Banks' ten-track extended play, Prize (styled as PRIZE), as a mix tape in mid-2018. Banks has co-written songs for fellow Australian artists. She supported What So Not on his national tour. By November 2017, her music had accumulated over 20 million plays on Spotify.

Early life
Kota Banks was born in 1994 in Sydney, Australia, as Jessica Mimi Porfiri, in Sydney. She spent her late childhood and teens in Florence, a formative time that shaped her identity and connection to her heritage. Banks has been singing since the age of 9. She returned to Sydney.

Personal life
Banks is a Christian. She prays every time she writes music. In an article with The Daily Telegraph, she said:"I just feel like it [praying] gives me more depth to my songwriting and opens my mind."

Career
Banks' debut single, "N.F.F.A.", was issued in 2016 and was co-written by Banks with Lee Chew (or Toby Chew-Lee) and Cameron Nacson. It was produced by the duo as MOZA. Troy Mutton of Pile Rats described how she, "dabbles in some seriously fun electronic-pop", and described her single as a "bold track both production-wise and lyrically, catchy as and slotting right alongside artists such as Nicole Millar, Jess Kent and Danish artist MØ."

Her second single, "Holiday", appeared in 2017, which was co-written with Danny Omerhodic, who produced the track for NLV Records, as Swick. "Empty Streets" featuring MOZA, was her next single in that year, which was also co-written with Chew and Nacson. For the Junior Eurovision Song Contest of 2017, Banks, Chew and Nacson, with Chloe Papandrea, co-wrote Australia's entry, "Speak Up". It was performed by Isabella Clarke in Tbilisi, where Clarke finished third.

For the FOMO Festival in Adelaide, Banks joined Nina Las Vegas (a.k.a. Nina Agzarian) on-stage to perform "Holiday" in January 2018. The pair co-wrote "Alibrandi" with Omerhodic, which Las Vegas performs using Banks on vocals. In March her single, "Zoom", was premiered on Triple J's Good Nights and subsequently received high rotation on the national youth radio station. Triple J's Al Newstead declared, "this [track] has grown on us hard. It's a fun, flirty mix of dancehall and pop elevated by the fanciful production."

Banks released her debut extended play, Prize (styled as PRIZE), in mid-2018, as a ten-track mix tape. It was produced by Omerhodic, who shared the song writing with Banks on most of its tracks. AltMedias Jamie Apps rated it at three-and-a-half stars and explained, "[she] is not just a one hit wonder though as throughout the remainder of the record Banks carries the momentum forward as she celebrate feminine strength and empowerment." Following the release of PRIZE, Banks announced her debut national headline tour, selling out her hometown show. 

From July 2019, Banks began releasing her music under Sony Music Entertainment Australia.

Discography

Mixtapes

Extended plays

Singles

As lead artist

As featured artist

Notes

Music videos

References

1994 births
21st-century Australian singers
21st-century Australian women singers
Australian women pop singers
Australian musicians
Living people
Sony Music Australia artists